Naqdali may refer to:
 Naqdali-ye Olya
 Naqdali-ye Sofla
 Naqd Ali